Battle of Sambisa Forest may refer to:

 Fighting in Sambisa Forest during the 2015 West African offensive
 2016 Sambisa forest attack
 Battle of Sambisa Forest (2021)